Wailly is a commune in the Pas-de-Calais department in the Hauts-de-France region of France.

Geography

Population

Places of interest
 Wailly Chateau.
 The church of St.Pierre, rebuilt after 1918.
 The Commonwealth War Graves Commission cemetery.

See also
Communes of the Pas-de-Calais department

References

External links

 Wailly Orchard CWGC cemetery

Communes of Pas-de-Calais